St Edmund Campion Catholic School is a coeducational Catholic secondary school and sixth form located on the corner of Holly Lane and Sutton New Road in the Erdington area of Birmingham, England.

In September 1975, Sister Bernadette, headmistress of St. Margaret Clitherow School, Sister Ingrid, headmistress of St. Agnes’ school and Mr. Doherty, Headmaster of St. Thomas of Canterbury handed over their keys to Mr. Loughran, the headmaster of the newly formed St. Edmund Campion School, which opened using the three sites of the constituent schools.

Until September 2004, the school was situated on two sites. Works completed in 2005 integrated the campus.

In September 2005, the school was granted Specialist Language college status.

Previously a voluntary aided school administered by Birmingham City Council, in February 2020 St Edmund Campion Catholic School converted to academy status. The school is now sponsored by the St John Paul II Multi-Academy Company.

The school benefits from retreats to Soli House, Ogwen Cottage an outdoor activities centre in Snowdonia, Alton Castle. Members of the student body make annual pilgrimages to Lourdes with the Birmingham Diocese.

Notable former pupils
Gabriel Agbonlahor, Aston Villa F.C. Striker, England national football team Striker,
Michael Ricketts, Bolton Wanderers F.C. Striker, England national football team
Jo Enright, comedian, appeared in Phoenix Nights, Lab Rats, Time Trumpet, Peter Kay's Britain's Got the Pop Factor..., I'm Alan Partridge
Darren Byfield, Millwall F.C. Striker
Oscar Gobern, Southampton F.C. Midfielder
Barry Bannan, Aston Villa F.C First Team, Midfield
Luke Lennon-Ford, Team GB Athlete 4 × 400 m
Mark Burke, Aston Villa FC, Wolverhampton Wanderers FC, Middlesbrough FC
Gary Steer, Cricketer, Warwickshire CCC / Derbyshire CCC

References

External links
 Ofsted Reports

Secondary schools in Birmingham, West Midlands
Educational institutions established in 1975
Erdington
Catholic secondary schools in the Archdiocese of Birmingham
1975 establishments in England
Academies in Birmingham, West Midlands